Frank Watson may refer to:

 Frank Watson (American politician) (born 1945), Republican Minority Leader of the Illinois State Senate
 Frank Watson (Bahamas politician) (born 1940), former Deputy Prime Minister of the Bahamas
 Frank Watson (cricketer) (1898–1976), English first-class cricketer
 Frank Watson (footballer) (1898–1972), English football forward
 Frank Watson (rugby league) (1923–2016), rugby league footballer of the 1940s and 1950s for Leeds, and Castleford
 Frank Rushmore Watson (1859–1940), Philadelphia architect

See also
 Frank Watson Dyson (1868–1939), English astronomer
 Francis Watson (disambiguation)